Norman or Normans may refer to:

Ethnic and cultural identity
 The Normans, a people partly descended from Norse Vikings who settled in the territory of Normandy in France in the 9th and 10th centuries
 People or things connected with the Norman conquest of southern Italy in the 11th and 12th centuries
 Norman dynasty, a series of monarchs in England and Normandy
 Norman architecture, romanesque architecture in England and elsewhere
 Norman language, spoken in Normandy
 People or things connected with the French region of Normandy

Arts and entertainment
 Norman (film), a 2010 drama film
 Norman: The Moderate Rise and Tragic Fall of a New York Fixer, a 2016 film
 Norman (TV series), a 1970 British sitcom starring Norman Wisdom
 The Normans (TV series), a documentary
 "Norman" (song), a 1962 song written by John D. Loudermilk and recorded by Sue Thompson
 "Norman (He's a Rebel)", a song by Mo-dettes from The Story So Far, 1980

Businesses
 Norman ASA, producers of antivirus and other security software
 Norman Cycles, a British bicycle, autocycle, moped, and motorcycle manufacturer
 Norman Guitars, a guitar brand from Canada

People
 Norman (name), including list of persons and fictional characters with the name
 Montagu Norman, 1st Baron Norman (1871–1950), English banker, Governor of the Bank of England from 1920 to 1944
 Norman baronets, a title in the Baronetage of the United Kingdom
 Norman the Lunatic and Norman the Maniac, ring names of American professional wrestler Mike Shaw (1957–2010)

Places

United States
 Norman, Arkansas, a town
 Norman, California, an unincorporated community
 Norman, Indiana, an unincorporated community
 Norman, Missouri, an unincorporated community
 Norman, Nebraska, a village
 Norman, North Carolina, a town
 Lake Norman, North Carolina, a man-made lake
 Norman, Oklahoma, a city
 Norman, Wisconsin, an unincorporated community
 Norman Township (disambiguation)

Elsewhere
 Norman Island, British Virgin islands
 Cape Norman, Newfoundland, Canada
 Norman (crater), on the Moon

Ships and boats
 , several ships of the Royal Australian Navy
 , an American bulk freighter which sank in 1895
 Norman boat, a cabin cruiser built by Norman Cruisers limited

Other uses
 Tropical Storm Norman, including a list of storms with the name
 Norman High School, Norman, Oklahoma, United States
 Norman (horse), a Thoroughbred racehorse
 Norman four notrump, a slam bidding convention in the card game contract bridge

See also
 Norman House, on Steep Hill, Lincoln, England, an historic building
 The Norman House (York), a grade I listed building and scheduled monument in York, England
 Normand, a surname
 

Language and nationality disambiguation pages